is a former Japanese football player.

Club statistics

References

External links

1982 births
Living people
Sendai University alumni
Association football people from Miyagi Prefecture
Japanese footballers
J1 League players
J2 League players
JEF United Chiba players
Hokkaido Consadole Sapporo players
Association football midfielders